Halococcus qingdaonensis is a halophilic archaeon in the family Halococcaceae.

References

Euryarchaeota
Archaea described in 2007